Evansdale is a neighbourhood in northeast Edmonton, Alberta, Canada. It and the Northmount neighbourhood to the south comprise Edmonton's Dickinsfield community.

Evansdale is bounded by the Griesbach neighbourhood across 97 Street to the west, the Eaux Claires and Belle Rive neighbourhoods across 153 Avenue to the north,  the Kilkenny neighbourhood across 82 Street to the east, and the Northmount neighbourhood across 144 Avenue to the south.

The community is represented by the Evansdale Community League, established in 1971, which maintains a community hall and outdoor rink located at 91 Street and 150 Avenue.

Demographics 

Housing 
In 2005, Evandale's housing breakdown consisted of 54% single-family dwellings, 24% low-rise apartments (fewer than five storeys), 19% row houses, and 3% duplexes.

Education 
There are three schools in Evansdale including Evansdale Elementary School operated by Edmonton Public Schools and Cardinal Leger Catholic Junior High School and St. Philip Catholic Elementary School operated by Edmonton Catholic Schools.

Surrounding neighbourhoods

See also 
 Edmonton Federation of Community Leagues

References 

Neighbourhoods in Edmonton